{{DISPLAYTITLE:C6H3Cl2NO2}}
The molecular formula C6H3Cl2NO2 (molar mass: 192.01 g/mol) may refer to:
 Clopyralid, a selective herbicide
 1,2-Dichloro-4-nitrobenzene, an intermediate in the synthesis of agrochemicals
 1,3-Dichloro-2-nitrobenzene
 1,4-Dichloro-2-nitrobenzene